Shenbakkam Raghavendra Swami Mutt is an ancient temple located on the banks of the Palar river, in Vellore district, Shenbakkam. It is located in the Indian state of Tamil Nadu around 130 km from Chennai and 200 km from Bangalore.

History and significance of the temple 

Sri Madhvacharya visited this Navabrindavana and wrote a grantha on Vishnu Sahasranamam.
Sri Vyasaraja, the previous incarnation of Sri Raghavendra installed a Sanjeeviraya Hanuman Idol here.

Description 

At the entrance are the brindavanas of Sri Sripathi Theertha and Sri Kambaal Ramachandra Theertha of the Vyasaraja Matha.

On the first floor, the brindavanas of Sri Vidyapathi Theertha and Sri Sathyathiraja Theertha of Uttaradi Mutt are side by side.

Below their brindavanas, in a somewhat underground chamber, appear smaller brindavanas of Sri Kesava Udayaru, Sri Govinda Madhava Udayaru, Sri Bhoovaraaga Udayaru, and Sri Raghunatha Udayaru, about whom not much is known.

An early 1990s mrithika brindavana of Sri Raghavendra Swamy, makes it a Dhakshina Navabrindavana.

Festivals 

 January: English New Year, Hanuma Jayanthi, Purandardas Aradhana
 February: Madhwa Navami
 March: 1st- Raghavendra Pattabishekam, Vyasaraya Aradhana, Ugadi
 April: 14- Tamil New Year-1008 sangu Abhishekam
 May: Akshaya Thrithiya
 June: 9-Brindhavan pradhistha day (In 1993, Navabrindhavan is established on this day)
 July: Sri sripathi Theerthar Aradhana
 August: Vidyapathi Theerthar Aradhana-Uthradi Mutt, Sri Sathyathiraja Theerthar Aradhana, IMP- Sri Sri Raghavendra Aradhana for 3 consecutive days
 October: Vanabhojana
 November: Karthigai Full Moon Day- 1Lakh Dhiya will be lighted
 December: Sri Kambaal Ramachandra Theerthar Aradhana

Every Thursday, special poojas are performed except on Ekadesi day.

References 

 

Hindu temples in Vellore district